The 1996 Rhythmic Gymnastics European Championships is the 12th edition of the Rhythmic Gymnastics European Championships, which took place from 29 May to 02 June 1996 in Asker, Norway.

Medal winners

Medal table

References 

1996 in gymnastics
Rhythmic Gymnastics European Championships